Qarah Bolagh-e Khan (also Romanized as Qarah Bolāgh-e Khān, Qareh Bolāgh-e Khān, and Qareh Bolāgh Khān; also known as Ghareh Bolagh Khan, Khār-i-Bāla, Qarah Bolāgh, Qareh Bolāgh, and Qareh Būlākh) is a village in Qaslan Rural District, Serishabad District, Qorveh County, Kurdistan Province, Iran. At the 2006 census, its population was 250, in 58 families. The village is populated by Azerbaijanis.

References 

Towns and villages in Qorveh County
Azerbaijani settlements in Kurdistan Province